Mayhem on the High Seas is an EP by the punk rock band Tsunami Bomb. Mayhem on the High Seas was the second album released on the Checkmate Records label, founded by AFI bassist Hunter Burgan. The album was the first complete record released by the band, after their split-EP B-Movie Queens with Plinky.

Track listing

Side one
"3 Days & 1000 Nights" - 3:30
"Rotting Vampire Eyeballs" - 2:53

Side two
"Cantare del Morte" - 4:08
"Breakaway" - 1:02

External links 
 Tsunami Bomb's official website

Tsunami Bomb albums
1999 EPs